The Sri Lanka cricket team toured South Africa in February and March 2019 to play two Tests, five One Day Internationals (ODIs) and three Twenty20 International (T20I) matches. The ODI fixtures were part of both teams' preparation for the 2019 Cricket World Cup.

In February 2019, Sri Lanka named Dimuth Karunaratne as the captain of their Test side, after Dinesh Chandimal was dropped due to poor form. Chandimal was also omitted from Sri Lanka's ODI squad for the tour. Sri Lanka won the Test series 2–0, their first Test series win in South Africa. It was also the first time that a team from Asia had won a Test series in South Africa.

South Africa won the ODI series 5–0. It was the fourth time in less than two years that Sri Lanka had been whitewashed in a five-match ODI series. For the T20I series, Faf du Plessis was named as South Africa's captain for the first match, with JP Duminy named as captain for the remaining two fixtures. South Africa also completed a whitewash in the T20I series, winning 3–0.

Squads

Ahead of the last two ODIs, Aiden Markram, Hashim Amla and JP Duminy were added to South Africa's squad, with Reeza Hendricks and Wiaan Mulder being dropped. However, the day after Amla was added to South Africa's ODI squad, he took compassionate leave, missing the last two matches, with Hendricks recalled. Kusal Perera was ruled out of Sri Lanka's ODI squad for the final two ODIs, after suffering a hamstring injury in the third ODI. Lungi Ngidi and Anrich Nortje were ruled out of South Africa's T20I squad for the final two T20Is due to injury. Junior Dala was added to South Africa's squad for the third T20I.

Test series

1st Test

2nd Test

Tour match

50-over match: Cricket South Africa Invitation XI vs Sri Lanka

ODI series

1st ODI

2nd ODI

3rd ODI

4th ODI

5th ODI

T20I series

1st T20I

2nd T20I

3rd T20I

Notes

References

External links
 Series home at ESPN Cricinfo

2019 in South African cricket
2019 in Sri Lankan cricket
International cricket competitions in 2018–19
Sri Lankan cricket tours of South Africa